Isaac Oliver (c. 1565 – bur. 2 October 1617) or Olivier was an English portrait miniature painter.

Life and work

Born in Rouen, he moved to London in 1568 with his Huguenot parents Peter and Epiphany Oliver to escape the Wars of Religion in France. He then studied miniature painting under Nicholas Hilliard; and developed a naturalistic style, which was largely influenced by Italian and Flemish art. His first wife, Elizabeth, died in 1599. With her he fathered Peter Oliver, who was also eminent in miniature painting. In 1602, he married Sara, daughter of the well-known portrait painter Marcus Gheeraerts the Elder (c. 1520 – c. 1590) and his wife Susannah de Critz. Susannah was the daughter of Troilus de Critz, a goldsmith from Antwerp, and close relative of John de Critz, the Queen's Serjeant-Painter. She was also the eldest sister or cousin of Magdalen de Critz, who married Marcus Gheeraerts the Younger (1562–1635).

After the death of Elizabeth I, he became a painter of James I's court, painting numerous portraits of the queen Anne of Denmark and Henry Frederick, Prince of Wales.

Some of his work is housed in Windsor Castle. Some of his pen drawings are located in the British Museum.

Gallery

Portrait miniatures

Larger works

See also
List of British artists

References

External links

Isaac Oliver online (ArtCyclopedia)
Three Louvre miniatures recently attributed to Isaac Oliver  (The Art Tribune – 20 Sep. 2008)

1560s births
1617 deaths
16th-century English painters
English male painters
17th-century English painters
Portrait miniaturists
Huguenots
English portrait painters
French portrait painters
French emigrants to the Kingdom of England
French Baroque painters
Artists from London